Puliakulam is a residential neighborhood in the city of Coimbatore. Arulmigu Munthi Vinayagar Temple and Abirami Amman Kovil are famous facecets of this place. This place has seen an influx of migrated population in the last decade, due to its accessibility and convenience. The Idol in Puliakulam Vinayagar Temple is one of the biggest single stone statues in Asia.

Geography
Puliakulam is situated just 4 km from the heart of city (Townhall and Gandhipuram), and only 3 km to railway station and 8.5 km to Coimbatore airport.  It borders with Papanaiken palayam in the North, Meena Estate in the East, Ramanathapuram in the South and Race course in the West. The two national highways  NH 544 (Avinashi road) and NH 67 (Tiruchy road) are just 0.5 km away.

Population
According to India Census 2001, Puliakulam is considered one of the most densely populated areas in Coimbatore City. The town is primarily inherited by Kongu Vellalar community.

Politics
Puliakulam comes under ward number 70 in the Coimbatore Corporation and comes under Coimbatore South (State Assembly Constituency).

Culture
The village of old Puliakulam is very well ordered. The people belong to 12 different Kula Theivams having separate temple for each one of them, where the festivals are celebrated in the month of August (Tamil month of Aadi).  There is also a temple for the primary deity of the village "Mariamman". The old martial arts of Wrestling and Silambam are still practiced and performed.

Economy
Most of population living here is working class. The place now has booming entrepreneurs. The following are the few companies located in Puliakulam.
Mahendra pumps
Precot Head office

Transport
 Air
Coimbatore airport is only 11 km. (See Coimbatore Airport for more information)
 Rail
Coimbatore railway junction is only 4 km. (See Coimbatore Railway Station for more information)
 Road
Puliakulam is very well connected by road. The bus transport is available from 4am to 11 pm. The local auto rickshaws support during the day and night hours.

Education
 Corporation girls higher secondary school
 Carmel Garden higher secondary school
 St. Anthony boy’s higher secondary school
 Kendriya Vidyalaya
 St. Therasa's Middle School
 Vidhya Niketan Public School

References

Neighbourhoods in Coimbatore